"Until You Come Back to Me" is a song by British group Floy Joy, which was released in 1984 as the second single from their debut studio album Into the Hot. The song was written by Shaun Ward and Michael Ward, and produced by Don Was. "Until You Come Back to Me" peaked at No. 91 in the UK Singles Chart.

"Until You Come Back to Me" originated with Michael Ward and was the first tune he ever wrote.

Critical reception
On its release, Dylan Jones Uppers of Record Mirror selected the "torch-like ballad" as "single of the week" and wrote, "These sweet and sulty chatterbox hazy rhythms should place the Floy Joys on the chart-mart in next to no time." Richard Cook of New Musical Express commented, "This is a beautiful piece of work, exactly the kind of tender, dignified soul groove Sade wanted to hit on 'Why Can't We Live Together'." He added, "Carroll Thompson sings this plea for supplication with a deceptive ease of a proper singer with a song to work on, embroidered by saxophones that bleed lyrical heartache and an underlie of rhythm which allows no chance for the tune to idle at any stopover."

Paul Massey of the Aberdeen Evening Express wrote, "Easily the best track on Into the Hot, and richly deserving of a chart place. Thompson has a soulful voice that just burns with energy. Tremendous." Paul Benbow of the Reading Evening Post considered the song to be an "average ballad from the blue-eyed soul outfit who I know can do better".

Track listing
7" single
"Until You Come Back to Me" - 4:12
"Theme from the Age of Reason" - 1:22

12" single
"Until You Come Back to Me" - 4:12
"Theme from the Age of Reason" - 1:22
"Into the Hot" - 3:32

12" single(UK limited edition 2x 12" vinyl pack)
"Until You Come Back to Me" - 4:12
"Theme from the Age of Reason" - 1:22
"Into the Hot" - 3:32
"Into the Hot (Club Mix)"
"When the Flies  Can't Stand the Heat" - 4:32

12" single (UK promo)
"Until You Come Back to Me" - 4:12
"Into the Hot (Club Mix)"
"Into the Hot (Instrumental)"

Cover versions
In 1991, American singer Adeva covered the song for her second studio album Love or Lust. In 1992, it was released by Cooltempo as a single in the UK and Europe. Adeva's version peaked at No. 45 in the UK. A music video was created to promote the single.

Personnel
Production
 Don Was – producer, engineer
 John 'Tokes' Potoker – mixing on "Until You Come Back to Me"
 Michael Bigwood – mixing on "Theme from the Age of Reason"

Other
 C-More-Tone Studios – sleeve

Charts

References

1984 singles
1984 songs
Floy Joy (band) songs
Virgin Records singles
Song recordings produced by Don Was